Kim-Sang Woo (born May 18, 1987 in Jinju) is a South Korean midfielder. He currently plays for Gimhae City FC.

Club statistics

References

External links

1987 births
Living people
South Korean footballers
South Korean expatriate footballers
J2 League players
Tokushima Vortis players
Korea National League players
Expatriate footballers in Japan
South Korean expatriate sportspeople in Japan
Association football midfielders
People from Jinju
Sportspeople from South Gyeongsang Province